Torfi Bryngeirsson (11 November 1926 – 16 July 1995) was an Icelandic athlete who competed in the 1948 Summer Olympics and in the 1952 Summer Olympics.

References

1926 births
1995 deaths
Torfi Bryngeirsson
Torfi Bryngeirsson
Torfi Bryngeirsson
Athletes (track and field) at the 1948 Summer Olympics
Athletes (track and field) at the 1952 Summer Olympics
European Athletics Championships medalists